Nara is a village and union council of Jhelum District in the Punjab Province of Pakistan. It is part of Jhelum Tehsil, and is located at 32°48'0N 73°24'0E with an altitude of 236 metres (777 feet).
Union council number 1 of jhelum. It has about 150 houses mostly populated by Maliks.
It is about 45 kilometres from main city which is jhelum

References

External links

Populated places in Tehsil Jhelum
Union councils of Jhelum Tehsil